Antennatus analis, known as the tailjet frogfish, is a species of fish in the family Antennariidae. It is native to the tropical Indo-Pacific, where it ranges from Christmas Island and Rowley Shoals to the Society Islands, including Fiji, Hawaii, Oahu, Palau, and Samoa. Its habitat ranges from tidal pools to outer reef slopes, where it occurs at depths of 2–21 m (7–69 ft). It is a benthic, oviparous species reaching 7.8 cm (3.1 inches) SL.

References 

Antennariidae
Fish of the Indian Ocean
Fish of the Pacific Ocean
Taxa named by Leonard Peter Schultz
Fish described in 1967